Bambū is a dessert drink chain. In 2021, QSR described the San Jose-based company as "the original and only Vietnamese-Chè dessert drink chain".

Founded in 2008, the company operates more than 70 locations in 22 U.S. states and Canada, as of 2021.

Locations

The business has operated in the following locations:

 Ann Arbor, Michigan
 Holland, Michigan
 Honolulu, Hawaii
 Milwaukee
 Seattle (Chinatown-International District), Washington

See also 

 List of Vietnamese restaurants

References

External links

 

Companies based in San Jose, California
Companies established in 2008
Vietnamese restaurants
Chinatown–International District, Seattle